Smilacicolini is a tribe of armored scale insects.

Genera
Smilacicola

References

Aspidiotinae
Hemiptera tribes